KK Olimpija history and statistics in FIBA Europe and Euroleague Basketball (company) competitions.

European competitions

Worldwide competitions

Record
KK Olimpija has overall, from 1958 (first participation) to 2015–16 (last participation): 236 wins against 260 defeats in 496 games for all the European club competitions.

 EuroLeague: 151–185 (336)
 FIBA Saporta Cup: 43–32 (75) /// EuroCup Basketball: 21–27 (48)
 FIBA Korać Cup: 21–16 (37)

See also 
 Yugoslav basketball clubs in European competitions

External links
FIBA Europe
EuroLeague
ULEB
EuroCup

KK Olimpija
Olimpija